The Tees Newport Bridge is a vertical-lift bridge spanning the River Tees a short distance upriver from Tees Transporter Bridge, linking Middlesbrough with the borough of Stockton-on-Tees, Northern England. It no longer lifts, but still acts as a road bridge in its permanently down position.

Design 

Designed by Mott, Hay and Anderson and built by local company Dorman Long,
who have also been responsible for such structures as the Tyne Bridge and Sydney Harbour Bridge, it was the first large vertical-lift bridge in Britain.

In the event of motor failure a standby 450 H.P. petrol engine could be employed to move the bridge, but should both systems fail it was possible to raise or lower the span manually using a winch mechanism.
It was estimated in 1963 by Mr R. Batty, long time Bridge Master at Newport Bridge, that "it would take 12 men eight hours" to complete the movement by hand.

Opening and operation 

The bridge was inaugurated by Prince Albert, Duke of York (later King George VI) and opened to traffic on 28 February 1934.

Originally, 12 men would have been employed to man the bridge around the clock, usually requiring four to drive it at any one time. This was accomplished from the oak-panelled winding house situated midway along the bridge span. During the 1940s and early 1950s this would occur up to twice a day with an average of 800 vessels per year passing under it, despite staffing difficulties during the 1940s when men were away fighting. However, as the number of ships needing to sail up to Stockton-on-Tees declined, so did the usage of the bridge.

The legal requirement to lift the bridge for shipping traffic was removed in 1989 after the repeal of a Parliamentary Act. Before mechanical decommissioning Mr Ian MacDonald, who worked on the bridge from 1966, finally as Bridge Master, supervised the final lift on 18 November 1990.

The Tees Newport Bridge still serves as a road bridge, carrying considerable traffic as a section of the A1032, despite the presence of the A19 Tees Viaduct a short distance upriver.
In recent years it was repainted in its original green and some minor maintenance took place on the wire ropes and counterbalances which still take the majority of the bridge load.
In 1988 the bridge was given Grade II Listed Building status.

In July 2014, work started to paint the bridge red and silver to mark its 80th anniversary. This was planned to take six weeks but was completed behind schedule and over budget mainly because of the poor condition of the steelwork, the result of lack of maintenance.

As ships dock on the banks of the River Tees up to the Tees Newport Bridge the Admiralty publishes tide times for the bridge location.

See also 

 List of bridges in England for other notable bridges

References

External links 

 Bridge Information: Middlesbrough Council and Now & Then magazine
  Gazette Live article including construction pictures. The Ups and Downs of the Newport Bridge, by Paul Delplanque
 
 Tees Newport Bridge at Bridges on the Tyne
 Warwick, Tosh (2011), 'The Politics of Bridge Building: The Long Wait for the Tees (Newport) Bridge'. Cleveland History, 99. pp. 37–48.  
 Images: Flickr
 Video of the final lift in November 1990

Bridges in County Durham
Bridges in North Yorkshire
Vertical lift bridges in the United Kingdom
Crossings of the River Tees
Buildings and structures in Middlesbrough
Buildings and structures in the Borough of Stockton-on-Tees
Bridges completed in 1934
Transport in Middlesbrough
Transport in the Borough of Stockton-on-Tees
Grade II* listed buildings in North Yorkshire
1934 establishments in England